Lake Le-Aqua-Na State Recreation Area is an Illinois state park on  in Stephenson County, Illinois, United States. The park surrounds and includes Lake Le-Aqua-Na.

References

State parks of Illinois
Protected areas of Stephenson County, Illinois
Protected areas established in 1948
1948 establishments in Illinois